This is a list of towns and villages in County Galway, Ireland.

A
 Ahascragh
 Ardrahan
 Athenry
 Aughrim

B
 Ballinasloe
 Ballinderreen
 Ballyconneely
 Ballygar
 Ballymacward
 Ballymoe
 Ballynahinch
 Barna
 Bealadangan
 Belclare
 Bullaun

C
 Camus
 Carna
 Carnmore
 Carraroe
 Casla
 Castleblakeney
 Castlegar
 Claregalway
 Clarinbridge
 Cleggan
 Clifden
 Clonbur
 Clonfert
 Corofin
 Corrandulla
 Corr na Móna
 Craughwell

D
 Dunmore

E
 Eyrecourt

F
 Furbo

G
 Galway
 Glenamaddy
 Gort

H
 Headford

I
 Inverin

K
 Kilcolgan
 Kilconly
 Kilconnell
 Kilkerrin
 Kilkieran
 Killimor
 Kilronan
 Kiltormer
 Kiltullagh
 Kinvara
 Knocknacarra

L
 Laurencetown
 Leenaun
 Letterfrack
 Lettermore
 Loughrea

M
 Maam Cross
 Maum
 Menlough
 Milltown
 Monivea
 Mountbellew
 Moycullen

N
 Newbridge
 New Inn

O
 Oranmore
 Oughterard

P
 Peterswell
 Portumna

R
 Recess
 Rosmuck
 Rossaveal
 Roundstone

S
 Skehana
 Spiddal

T
 Tully
 Tully Cross
 Tuam
 Turloughmore

W
 Williamstown
 Woodford

References

 
Towns and villages